KECO (96.5 FM) is a radio station broadcasting a Country music format. Licensed to Elk City, Oklahoma, United States. The station is currently owned by Paragon Communications, Inc.

References

External links

Country radio stations in the United States
ECO
Radio stations established in 1976
1976 establishments in Oklahoma